Sakaeo Football Club (Thai : สโมสรฟุตบอลจังหวัดสระแก้ว) is a Thailand professional football club based in Mueang Sa Kaeo District, Sa Kaeo province. The team plays their home matches at Sa Kaeo Provincial Administrative Organization Stadium. The club is currently playing in the Thai League 3 Eastern region.

History 
Sakaeo United were formed by Sorawong Thienthong the Member of parliament of Sakaeo Province in 2010.

Stadium and locations

Season by season record

Players

Current squad

References

External links
 Official Website of Sakaeo United
 Official Facebook page of Sakaeo FC

Association football clubs established in 2010
Football clubs in Thailand
Sa Kaeo province
2010 establishments in Thailand